Highway 231 (AR 231, Ark. 231, and Hwy. 231) is a designation for three north–south state highways in northeast Arkansas. All three segments serve rural, agricultural areas in the Arkansas Delta. One segment of  runs north from U.S. Route 412 (US 412) to Highway 34. A second route of  begins at Highway 90 near O'Kean and runs north to Highway 304 at Sharum. A third segment of  begins at Highway 251 and runs to Highway 93. All routes are maintained by the Arkansas State Highway and Transportation Department (AHTD).

Route description

Lawrence County
The highway begins at U.S. Route 412 (US 412) east of Walnut Ridge near the Cache River and the Green County line. Highway 231 runs north through an agricultural area before turning northwest and intersecting the Union Pacific Railroad line, which parallels Highway 34 through the region. Shortly after this at-grade crossing, Highway 231 terminates at Highway 34.

O'Kean to Sharum
Highway 231 begins in the southeast corner of Randolph County near the city of O'Kean at an intersection with Highway 90. The minor connector route runs due north along a section line to Highway 304, where it terminates near the unincorporated community of Sharum. The highway serves an agricultural area near the Black River.

Randolph County
Highway 231 begins at Highway 251 several miles northwest of Pocahontas near the Missouri state line. Odd-numbered Arkansas state highways are traditionally north–south routes, and as a result, are usually signed north–south even if the actual roadway alignment is east–west. This segment of Highway 231 runs west, passing through the unincorporated community of Hamil, to Highway 93, where it terminates.

Major intersections

|-
| colspan= 6 align=center | Highway 231 begins near O'Kean

|-
| colspan= 5 align=center | Highway 231 begins in northern Randolph County

History
The segment between O'Kean and Sharum was adopted as a state highway by the Arkansas State Highway Commission on March 28, 1973. A section between Warm Springs and Middlebrook was also created at the same meeting. A section near College City between US 67 and the Walnut Ridge Industrial Park was added as a state highway on April 9, 1980. The section between Warm Springs and Middlebrook was swapped for the section between Highway 251 and Highway 93 at the request of the Randolph County Judge on November 6, 1980.

Former routes

Middlebrook to Warm Springs

Highway 231 (AR 231, Ark. 231, and Hwy. 231) is a former state highway in Randolph County, Arkansas. The highway ran from Highway 115 near Middlebrook west to Highway 251 at Warm Springs.

College City

Highway 231 (AR 231, Ark. 231, and Hwy. 231) is a former state highway in Lawrence County, Arkansas. The highway ran from US 67 near College City to the Walnut Ridge Industrial Park.

See also

References

231
Transportation in Lawrence County, Arkansas
Transportation in Randolph County, Arkansas